Zogong County, (Tibetan: མཛོ་སྒང་རྫོང་ Wylie mdzo sgang rdzong; Chinese: 左贡县; Pinyin: Zuǒgòng Xiàn)  is a county of the Chamdo Prefecture in  the Tibet Autonomous Region,

Climate

Transportation 

China National Highway 214
China National Highway 318

References

Counties of Tibet
Chamdo